Marcellin may refer to:
 Marcellin (given name)
 Raymond Marcellin (1914–2004), French politician
 Marcellin Champagnat (1789-1840), Catholic Saint and educator

 places
 Marcellin College, Bulleen, a Marist Catholic secondary boys' school situated in Bulleen, Victoria, Australia
 Marcellin College, Auckland, an integrated, co-educational college in Royal Oak, Auckland, New Zealand
 Marcellin College Randwick, a systemic Roman Catholic, secondary, day school for boys, located in Randwick, a south-eastern suburb of Sydney, New South Wales, Australia

 other 
 Marcellin Act, a law establishing the Associated communes of France
 Saint-Marcellin (disambiguation)